The 1961 County Championship was the 62nd officially organised running of the County Championship. Hampshire won their first ever Championship title.

For the 1961 season, the follow-on was abolished in the County Championship, when play took place on the first day of matches. Teams were able to forfeit their second innings, but none did so.

Table
12 points for a win
6 points to side still batting in the fourth innings of a match in which scores finish level
2 points for first innings lead
2 bonus points for side leading on first innings if they also score faster on runs per over in first innings
If no play possible on the first two days, and the match does not go into the second innings, the side leading on first innings scores 8 points.
Teams played either 28 or 32 matches. Therefore, a final average was calculated by dividing the points by the matches played which determined the final placings.

References

1961 in English cricket
County Championship seasons